"One Love" is a song recorded by Canadian pop rock group Marianas Trench for their fourth studio album, Astoria (2015). It was released to digital retailers through 604 Records, Cherrytree Records, and Interscope Records on September 14, 2015 as the album's lead single, and was later serviced to American hot adult contemporary radio on November 9, 2015 through 604 Records. The song was written, composed, and produced by the band's lead singer, Josh Ramsay.

Composition
"One Love" is a midtempo ballad written by Josh Ramsay with a duration of four minutes and one second (4:01). It has been described primarily as pop, in a departure from the rock and pop punk influences of the band's earlier work. Lyrically, the song discusses the concept of soulmates and addresses a situation in which one meets their supposed "true love" but the relationship does not last, with an overarching theme of love gone wrong.

Commercial performance
"One Love" entered the Billboard Canadian Hot 100 at number 60 on the chart dated October 3, 2015. The same week, the song debuted at number 19 on the Hot Canadian Digital Songs component chart. The song reached its peak position of 50 on the former four weeks later, on the chart dated November 28, 2015. In addition, the song has charted within the top 20 on the nation's adult contemporary, mainstream top 40, and hot adult contemporary airplay charts, with a peak position of 14 on the former giving the band their most successful AC single since Billboard began publishing the chart in 2012.

On the chart dated December 12, 2015, "One Love" debuted at number 40 on the Billboard Adult Pop Songs chart, becoming the group's first charting single in the US. It reached a peak position of 35.

Music video
A lyric video for the song was uploaded to the band's Vevo channel on October 14, 2015 wherein the lyrics are depicted on the window of a moving train. The official music video was directed by Kyle Davison – who has directed all of their videos since "Haven't Had Enough" in 2011 – and premiered November 5, 2015. In the video, the band is trapped in a house rapidly filling with water, and the viewer is left with an ambiguous ending. The video was sponsored by MuchFACT.

Charts and certifications

Weekly charts

Certifications

Release history

References

2010s ballads
2015 singles
2015 songs
604 Records singles
Cherrytree Records singles
Interscope Records singles
Pop ballads
Songs written by Josh Ramsay
Marianas Trench (band) songs